NX300 may refer to:
 Lexus NX300, a motor vehicle
 Samsung NX300, a camera model